Caradrina flavirena is a moth of the family Noctuidae. It was described by Achille Guenée in 1852. It is found in Morocco, Algeria, southern Europe, Turkey, Israel, Lebanon, Jordan, Syria, Armenia and Iran. The habitat consists of grasslands.

There are two generations per year with adults on wing from March to May and again from September to October.

The larvae are polyphagous on low-growing herbs.

Subspecies
Caradrina flavirena flavirena
Caradrina flavirena zobeidah (Boursin, 1937) (Iraq)

References

External links

"Caradrina flavirena (Guenee, 1852)". Insecta.pro. Retrieved August 14, 2018.
 Lepiforum e.V.

Moths described in 1852
Caradrinini
Moths of Africa
Moths of Europe
Moths of Asia
Taxa named by Achille Guenée